Siberia is a 1998 Dutch comedy film directed by Robert Jan Westdijk about a group of young Dutchmen who systematically rob tourists after having sex. Baywatch star Nicole Eggert has a cameo role in the film. The film was premiered on August 27, 1998 and attracted an attendance of around 54,000.

Plot
Goof, Hugo and his two friends have a special hobby, they bed foreign female backpackers in Amsterdam, and then run off with their backpacks. One of the friends find it more fun to photograph their victims as a souvenir. When Goof falls in love with a foreign girl their hobby is in danger.

Cast
 Roeland Fernhout	... 	Goof
 Hugo Metsers   	... 	Hugo
 Vlatka Simac  	... 	Lara
 Nicole Eggert     ... 	Kristy
 Johnny Lion       ... 	Freddy
 Alessia Sorvillo   	... 	Angela
 Francesca Rizzo 	... 	Kika
 Nefeli Anthopoulou	... 	Marina
 Syan Blake    	... 	Maggie
 Katja Dreyer 	        ... 	Kate
 Bente Jonker  	... 	Ute
 Jos ten Bosch	        ... 	Clerk
 Elisabeth Estaras	... 	Rough Girl

External links 
 

1998 films
1998 comedy films
Dutch comedy films
1990s Dutch-language films
Films scored by Junkie XL
Films set in Amsterdam